Unforgivable Blackness: The Rise and Fall of Jack Johnson is a 2005 biographical documentary by filmmaker Ken Burns, based on the 2004 nonfiction book of the same name by Geoffrey C. Ward. It describes the life story of Jack Johnson, the first African-American Heavyweight Boxing Champion of the World It also describes racism and social inequality during the Jim Crow era, against which Johnson struggled.

Production
It is narrated by Keith David, with a soundtrack by Wynton Marsalis and with Samuel L. Jackson as the voice of Jack Johnson. Alan Rickman also contributed his voice to the documentary.  Stanley Crouch appears, offering commentary, including a quote from Johnson responding to a question from a white woman about black people, "We eat cold eels and think distant thoughts." This documentary is an example of a style frequently used by Burns, where a range of authorities gives voiceovers to contribute particular details. Stanley Crouch is the primary authority, offering personal recollections.

The film was produced by David Schaye, Paul Barnes and Ken Burns (Executive Producer) for Florentine Films.

Release and reception
The documentary was first broadcast on PBS in two parts, on January 17 and January 18, 2005.

In 2005, the film earned Ken Burns an Emmy Award for Outstanding Directing for Nonfiction Programming. Geoffrey C. Ward won an Emmy for Outstanding Writing for Nonfiction Programming. Keith David won an Emmy for Outstanding Voice-Over Performance.

See also
The Great White Hope, Howard Sackler's 1967 dramatization of Jack Johnson's life.

References

External links
 
 Unforgivable Blackness: The Rise and Fall of Jack Johnson at PBS

2005 television films
2005 films
Documentary films about boxing
Documentary films about sportspeople
American documentary television films
Television shows based on books
Films directed by Ken Burns
Racism in sport
Documentary films about racism in the United States
Cultural depictions of Jack Johnson
Primetime Emmy Award-winning broadcasts
2000s English-language films
2000s American films
African-American films